is a railway station on the Nemuro Main Line located in Hamanaka, Hokkaidō, Japan. It is operated by Hokkaido Railway Company (JR Hokkaido).

The station opened on 25 November 1919. It is unmanned station.

External links
 JR Hokkaido station information 

Railway stations in Japan opened in 1919
Railway stations in Hokkaido Prefecture
Stations of Hokkaido Railway Company
Hamanaka, Hokkaido